Lauren Lakis (born November 22, 1990) is an American film and stage actor, singer, and multi-instrumentalist.

Early life and education 
Lakis is a native of Baltimore. She became interested in acting while attending Goucher College, where she earned a bachelor's degree in photography. Lakis lived in Los Angeles for 10 years before relocating to Austin, Texas.

Career 
Lakis played the role of Karen in Confessions of a Teenage Jesus Jerk (2017). In 2020, Chloe Robinson of Earmilk praised Lakis for "distinct tones and profoundly honest songwriting" and noted that Lakis is "known for her stunningly organic compositions which create an ethereal and dreamy atmosphere."

In 2021, her album Daughter Language was released.

Filmography

Film

Television

References

1990 births
Living people
American film actresses
American women singers
People from Baltimore
21st-century American women
Actresses from Baltimore
Actresses from Maryland
Goucher College alumni